Khumbutse is the first mountain west (6 km) of Mount Everest. It lies at the border between Nepal and China.

Overview
Khumbutse's name indicates its location at the head of the Khumbu valley, down which the Khumbu Glacier flows. It is one of the prominent mountains above the southern Everest Base Camp, and is seen in many views from the nearby trekking routes, including at Gorak Shep.

Gallery

See also
 List of mountains in China
 List of mountains in Nepal
 Everest Base Camp

References

External links

 "Khumbutse" on Mountain-Forecast

Mountains of Koshi Province
Mountains of Tibet
China–Nepal border
International mountains of Asia
Six-thousanders of the Himalayas